Yogita Bihani is an Indian actress who made her television debut as Palak Sharma in Ekta Kapoor's romantic soap opera Dil Hi Toh Hai in 2018.

Early life and background 
Yogita was born on 7 August 1995. She has completed her high school education from Sumermal Jain Public School in 2012.  From 2012 to 2015, Yogita has attended Delhi University to complete her graduation in Computer Science. After completing her graduation from Delhi, she joined Redfoodie Startup in Faridabad, Delhi NCR and worked at different positions until 2016.

Bihani then moved to Mumbai and worked for Pratham Education Foundation as Sales and Marketing Coordinator. Later, she worked as a Manager (Sales and Operations) at Trilyo until 2018 when she was cast in the role of  Palak Sharma in Ekta Kapoor's Indian soap opera, Dil Hi Toh Hai on Sony TV. She then appeared on a few commercial advertisements and was seen in a cameo role in Ekta Kapoor 'supernatural show 'Kavach'. She also appeared in Netflix film Ak vs Ak in a supporting role.

She was recently seen playing the character of chanda in Vikram Vedha (2022 film).

Career 
Bihani's career in glamour world began in 2018 when she participated and was selected amongst Top 3 contestants in Femina Miss India Rajasthan  2018.

However her biggest break came in April 2018 when she was selected to shoot for the promo with Salman Khan for his upcoming gameshow Dus Ka Dum on Sony TV.

After the promo went on air, she was spotted by Ekta Kapoor an Indian film and television producer who later selected her to play the lead role opposite Karan Kundra in her next show Dil Hi Toh Hai.

She talked about her life challenges and how her choices shaped her career in her TED (conference) talk titled 'The Crossroad of Choices' in November 2020.

Filmography

Television

Film

References

External links 

 Yogita Bigai at IMDb
 

Living people
1994 births
Indian television actresses
Indian soap opera actresses
Actresses from Delhi
Actresses in Hindi television
21st-century Indian actresses